Hossein Karimi is an Iranian football midfielder who plays for Nassaji Mazandaran in the Azadegan League.

Club career

Early years
He started his career with Fajr Sepasi Academy. In summer 2011 he was promoted to the first team by Mahmoud Yavari. He made his debut for Fajr Sepasi on January 29, 2011 against Sepahan.

Paykan
Karimi joined Paykan in winter 2013. He made his debut for Paykan on January 12, 2014 against Aboumoslem as a starter and scored in the 45th minute. He helped Paykan gain promotion to the Pro League by scoring 3 times in 11 matches.

Club career statistics

References

External links
 Hossein Karimi at PersianLeague.com
 Hossein Karimi at IranLeague.ir
 Hossein Karimi instagram at instagram.com

Living people
Iranian footballers
Fajr Sepasi players
Paykan F.C. players
1992 births
Association football midfielders
People from Shiraz
Sportspeople from Fars province